Liu Cheng may refer to:

Liu Sheng (Southern Han) (920–958), Southern Han emperor, also known as "Liu Cheng"
Liu Cheng (footballer, born 1983), Chinese association footballer
Liu Cheng (footballer, born 1985), Chinese association footballer
Liu Cheng (badminton) (born 1992), Chinese badminton player

See also
 Liu Sheng (disambiguation)
 Liu Zheng (born 1954), former lieutenant-general in the People's Liberation Army of China